is a 2018 Japanese romantic comedy-drama film directed by Rikiya Imaizumi. Based on the novel of the same name by Mitsuyo Kakuta, the film stars Yukino Kishii, Ryo Narita, and Ryuya Wakaba.

The film premiered at the 2018 Tokyo International Film Festival, and received a theatrical release in Japan in April 2019.

Cast
 Yukino Kishii as Teruko Yamada
 Ryo Narita as Mamoru Tanaka
  as Yoko Sakamoto
 Ryuya Wakaba as Sei Nakahara
 Noriko Eguchi as Sumire

Reception
James Hadfield of The Japan Times gave the film a score of three out of five stars, calling it "an honest depiction of the vague boundaries of 20-something romance, and takes the time to show its unequal relationships from both sides."

References

External links
 

2018 films
2010s Japanese films
2018 romantic drama films
2018 romantic comedy-drama films
Japanese romantic drama films
Japanese romantic comedy-drama films